Khasso or Xaaso was a West African kingdom of the 17th to 19th centuries, occupying territory in what is today Senegal and the Kayes Region of Mali. Over two thousand years ago, it was part of Serer territory. From the 17th to 19th centuries, its capital was at Medina until its fall.

Seated at the head of the Senegal River, the Khasso kingdom was composed of Fulas who had immigrated to the area and integrated with the local Malinké and Soninké populations.  Séga Doua (r. 1681 - 1725) is remembered as the first Fankamala (king) of the Khasso, and his dynasty would last until the death of his descendant Demba Séga in 1796.  Following a civil war between his sons Dibba Samballa et Demba Maddy, the kingdom fragmented into five smaller states, the most powerful of which was Dembaya under Hawa Demba Diallo (r. 1810-1833).

Like the Bambara Empire to the east, the Khasso kingdoms depended heavily on the slave trade for their economy.  A family's status was indicated by the number of slaves it owned, leading to wars for the sole purpose of taking more captives.  This trade led the Khasso into increasing contact with the European settlements of Africa's west coast, particularly the French.

In 1857, Toucouleur conqueror El Hadj Umar Tall attacked the Khasso as part of his jihad, but was repulsed at Medina Fort with the aid of the Khasso's French allies, particularly General Louis Faidherbe.  However, the Khasso found themselves increasingly under French control until they were assimilated into French Sudan in 1880.

Present-day inhabitants of this region often identify themselves as Khassonké.

External links
Pre-Colonial Malian History (French language)
Khasso.com (French language)
Khassonké music, song, and dance

Notes

Countries in precolonial Africa
History of Mali
French West Africa
Kayes
Kingdoms of Senegal
Serer history
Serer country